Johann Forster

Johann Forster may also refer to:

Johann Reinhold Forster
Johann Georg Adam Forster